Vegetarian Meat was an alternative rock band originally formed in 1990 in Dayton, Ohio by Alex McAulay, Dennis Cleary and Matt Cleary.  Signed by the No.6 Records label in 1992, while the band was still in high school, they released two 7" singles. The band was also joined by Manish Kalvakota on guitar. The band was termed "One to Watch" in Billboard magazine during a review of the "Squirrels in my Pumpkin" single. Later, the band added their classmates Matt Diggs on vocals, and Erin Castle on vocals as well.  In 1995, the band released its lone album on No.6/Caroline Records, Let's Pet, which was produced by Wharton Tiers. Soon after a series of shows with the bands Luna and Jennyanykind, Vegetarian Meat disbanded.

Alex McAulay went on to record four further albums under the name Charles Douglas, with members of The Velvet Underground and The Pixies, and has written several novels for MTV/Pocket Books.  Dennis Cleary currently works for the United Nations in Copenhagen.  Matt Cleary is the founder and owner of Sunday Group Management, a public relations firm in Indianapolis.  Manish Kalvakota recorded four solo albums and worked with Kurt Ralske of Ultra Vivid Scene. Matt Diggs has died.

In April 2009 Teenbeat Records released a compilation titled Speed Dating: A No.6 Records Compendium which features all six songs from Vegetarian Meat's out of print 7" singles, along with tracks from Unrest, Dean Wareham, Tindersticks, Pork, and The Dwarves.

External links
Interview with Alex McAulay

Musical groups established in 1990
Alternative rock groups from Ohio
Indie rock musical groups from Ohio
Musical groups from Dayton, Ohio